Pleasant Ridge United Methodist Church (Egbert Methodist Episcopal Church) is a historic church in Tiffin, Seneca County, Ohio.

It was built in 1890 and added to the National Register in 1993, along with its cemetery.

References

External links
 

United Methodist churches in Ohio
Cemeteries in Seneca County, Ohio
Churches on the National Register of Historic Places in Ohio
Gothic Revival church buildings in Ohio
Churches completed in 1890
Buildings and structures in Seneca County, Ohio
National Register of Historic Places in Seneca County, Ohio